Provincial Highway 88 is an expressway, which begins in Fongshan District, Kaohsiung on National Highway No. 1 and ends in Zhutian Township, Pingtung County on Yong-an Road.

Length

Exit List

{| class="plainrowheaders wikitable"
|-
!scope=col|City
!scope=col|Location
!scope=col|km
!scope=col|Mile
!scope=col|Exit
!scope=col|Name
!scope=col|Destinations
!scope=col|Notes
|-

Major Cities Along the Route
Kaohsiung City

Intersections with other Freeways and Expressways
National Highway No. 1 at Wujia JCT. in Fongshan District
National Highway No. 3 at Zhutian JCT. in Zhutian, Pingtung

See also
 Highway system in Taiwan

References

http://www.thb.gov.tw/

Highways in Taiwan